Alex Paxton-Beesley (born September 24, 1986) is a Canadian actress. She is noted for her acting roles in several TV series, including Copper, The Strain, Wynonna Earp, Cardinal and Pure.

Early life 
Paxton-Beesley was born and raised near the Grange Park neighbourhood of downtown Toronto close to the Art Gallery of Ontario (AGO) which is an art museum in Toronto, Ontario, Canada. Her first memory of acting on stage was in a playschool production as a rain cloud. When she was in the fourth grade, she moved to Italy for one year attending school there and learned to speak Italian. On her return to Canada, Paxton-Beesley attended the University of Toronto and was involved in a production of Buried Child with the Victoria College Dramatic Society.

Education and theatre work 
Paxton-Beesley graduated in 2008 from the George Brown Theatre School in Toronto, then went on to graduate from the Actors' Conservatory at the Canadian Film Centre.

Theatre 
Paxton-Beesley has been involved in stage work at The Company Theatre in Festen in 2008, at the Canadian Stage Company and the Citadel Theatre on Rock 'n' Roll in 2009, and at the Theatre Aquarius in The Woman in White. Paxton-Beesley was nominated and won an Outstanding Actress (Small) MyTheatre Award for her performance in Slip, for Circlesnake Productions, a complex psychological drama in which she played a detective,  at the Harbourfront Centre: World Stage, Toronto. The production later moved to the Tarragon Theatre, her performance receiving high praise from Theatre Critic Karen Fricker.

TV and film 
Paxton-Beesley first appeared on screen in 2004 in The Good Shepherd (also known as The Confessor (film), alongside Christian Slater and Molly Parker. Her television debut was in 2009, in Murdoch Mysteries and Being Erica. She was Young Rebecca in Warehouse 13, In 2012, she had a recurring role in The Firm as Sarah Holt for 9 episodes, the same year had a regular role in  Copper, an American Civil War drama, wherein she played Ellen Corcoran for 11 episodes. 

In 2014, she starred as Ann-Marie Barbour in series 3 of The Strain by Guillermo del Toro. The same year, she also starred in the film Dirty Singles, which featured at the 2014 Calgary International Film Festival.

In 2016, she played  Hetty Tate in Wynonna Earp. In 2018, she played the role of "Red", a brain-damaged shooting victim, in six episodes of the TV series Cardinal, and in the same year starring as Anna Funk in Pure.

In 2021, Paxton-Beesley played a lead role as Katherine in the TV film A Mother's Lie alongside Sonja Smits who played her mother.

Other work 
Paxton-Beesley offers advice to budding acting students that they be mentally, physically and emotionally prepared for the reality of rejection in auditions. She was purported to suggest to students at Niagara College Q-and-A session that of around 400 of her auditions (to 2014) only 10 per cent or so were successful.

Personal life
Her brother Tommy Paxton-Beesley is a musician, better known by the stage name River Tiber.

Filmography

Film

Television film

Television series

Awards and nominations

References

External links
 

1986 births
Living people
Actresses from Toronto
Canadian film actresses
Canadian television actresses
21st-century Canadian actresses